Penpak Sirikul (RTGS: Phenphak Sirikun), nickname Tai, is an actress and model, well known as Thai sex symbol and model in the 70s-80s later the 2,000-year Woman.

Biography 
Born in Chiang Mai, her real name is Wanphen Khuenkaeo. After winning a beauty contest when she was 19, Penpak became a swimsuit model.

Penpak's first film in 1980 was Dok Sanoh Ban Chao (The sanoh flower blooms in the morning), a drama directed by Jazz Siam. That same year she starred opposite Sorapong Chatree in Fai Narok Khum Lokan (Hell fire). She had a son, age 30 in February 2012.

Filmography 

 Dok Sanoh Ban Chao (1980) 
 Fai Narok Khum Lokan (1980) 
 The Victim (2006) as Fai
 13 Beloved (2006)
 The Bullet Wives (2005)
 Thida chaang (2004)
 Old Mad Rock (2003)
 Sherry Ann (2001) as Suwimol Phongphat
 The Legend of Suriyothai (2001) as Queen Jiraprapa
 Primary Love (2009) as Mother
 Secret Sunday (2010) as Nittaya
 The Hangover Part II (2011) as Joi
 Kon Khon (2011) as Sawn-Glin
 Home: Love, Happiness, Memories (2012) as Buachan
 It Gets Better (2012) as Saitarn
 She: Their Love Story (2012) as Bua
 The Last Executioner (2014) as Tew
 Devil (2014) as Nueasamut's Mom
 By the Time It Gets Dark (2016) as 2nd Taew
 A Gas Station (2016) as Jae-mat
 Senses from Siam (2016)
 Pop Aye (2017)

Television 
 Sood Sanae Ha (2009) as Napha "Fa" Boriban
 365 Wan Haeng Rak (2010) as prophet (Invited)
 Nuer Mek 2 (2012) as Phetthae Nawiyakun
 Luerd Mungkorn : Rhino (Channel 3, 2015)
 Nang Ai (Channel 3, 2016)
 Under Her Nose (2017) as Nida (EP. 15)
 Teen Mom The Series (Line TV 2017)
 Sai Tarn Hua Jai (Channel 3, 2017)
 Matuphoom Haeng Huachai (2018) as Techini Wasutraphaisan (Ni)
 Kham See Than Dorn (Channel 3, 2018)

Television series

References

External links 
 

1961 births
Living people
Penpak Sirikul
Penpak Sirikul
Penpak Sirikul
Penpak Sirikul
Penpak Sirikul